Estradiol valerate/norethisterone enantate (EV/NETE), sold under the brand name Mesigyna among others, is a form of combined injectable birth control which is used to prevent pregnancy in women. It contains estradiol valerate (EV), an estrogen, and norethisterone enantate (NETE), a progestin. The medication is given once a month by injection into muscle.

EV/NETE is approved for use in at least 36 countries, and is the most widely used combined injectable contraceptive. It is available widely throughout Latin America, in a few Asian and African countries, and in Turkey.

Medical uses
EV/NETE is used as a combined injectable contraceptive to prevent pregnancy in women. It is given by intramuscular injection once a month.

Available forms
EV/NETE is available in the form of an oil solution containing 5 mg estradiol valerate (EV) and 50 mg norethisterone enantate (NETE).

Pharmacology

Pharmacodynamics

EV/NETE is a combination of EV, an estrogen, and NETE, a progestogen with weak androgenic activity.

Through its progestogenic activity, NETE has potent antigonadotropic effects and can inhibit fertility and suppress sex hormone levels. A single intramuscular injection of EV/NETE has been found to strongly suppress testosterone levels in men. Levels of testosterone decreased from ~503 ng/dL at baseline to ~30 ng/dL at the lowest point (–94%) which occurred at day 7 post-injection.

Pharmacokinetics
Peak levels of estradiol after an intramuscular injection of EV/NETE (5 mg/50 mg) are reached within 2 days and range from 232 to 428 pg/mL.

History
EV/NETE, along with estradiol cypionate/medroxyprogesterone acetate (EC/MPA; code name HRP-112), was developed by the World Health Organization. Both EV/NETE and EC/MPA became available in 1993.

Society and culture

Generic names
EV/NETE is also known by its former developmental code name HRP-102.

Brand names
EV/NETE has been marketed under a variety of brand names including Chinese Injectable No. 3, Effectimes, Ginediol, Mesigyna, Mesilar, Meslart, Mesocept, Mesygest, Nofertyl, Nofertyl Lafrancol, Noregyna, Norestrin, Norifam, Norigynon, Nostidyn, Sexseg, and Solouna.

Availability
EV/NETE has been marketed in at least 36 countries, including Argentina, the Bahamas, Barbados, Bolivia, Brazil, Chile, Colombia, Costa Rica, the Dominican Republic, Ecuador, Egypt, El Salvador, Ghana, Grenada, Guatemala, Guyana, Haiti, Honduras, Jamaica, Kenya, Mexico, Nicaragua, Panama, Paraguay, Peru, St. Lucia, Turkey, Uruguay, Venezuela, and Zimbabwe. At least 15 of the countries in which EV/NETE is registered are Caribbean states. EV/NETE is the most widely used combined injectable contraceptive.

See also
 Combined injectable birth control § Available forms
 Special Programme on Human Reproduction
 List of combined sex-hormonal preparations

References

Combined injectable contraceptives
World Health Organization